Ronald David Hallstrom  (born June 11, 1959) is a former American football guard  in the National Football League for the Green Bay Packers and the Philadelphia Eagles. He played college football at the University of Iowa and was drafted in the first round of the 1982 NFL Draft.

References 

1959 births
Living people
American football offensive guards
Iowa Hawkeyes football players
Green Bay Packers players
Philadelphia Eagles players